is a role-playing video game for the Nintendo 64. It was released only in Japan, in 1999, having been demonstrated at Space World on August 27–29, 1999. It is part of the Robopon series, and can use the Transfer Pak with the Sun, Star, and Moon versions.

References

1999 video games
Games with Transfer Pak support
Japan-exclusive video games
Multiplayer and single-player video games
Nintendo 64 games
Nintendo 64-only games
Robopon
Role-playing video games
Video games about robots
Video games developed in Japan

ja:ロボットポンコッツ